"Sonne" [Sun] is a song by Farin Urlaub. It is the third single and the second track from his album Am Ende der Sonne. It is possibly about unrequited love or just distance between lovers, where the narrator is angry, because the sun shines, even though things are bad and the beloved one is not with him.

Video
The video is set in the feudal Japan and Farin plays a Japanese man. His wife leaves in the morning from their house. Meanwhile, Farin practices katana, thinks about the beginning of his and his wife's relationship and also meets a foe, whom he defeats. Right after, he discovers, that something is wrong and runs to find his wife, who's been ambushed with her two servants by a group of men. When Farin, gets there, it's too late - everyone is dead. He then finds the killers and avenges his wife. After that, he ends his life by harakiri.

Track listing
 "Sonne" ("Sun") – 4:40
 "Gefährlich" ("Dangerous") – 2:58
 "Hart" ("Tough") – 3:06
 "Sonne" (Video)

2005 singles
Songs written by Farin Urlaub
Farin Urlaub songs
2005 songs